The Odd Fellows Hall in Troy Mills, Iowa was built in 1900.  It served as a meeting place of the local International Order of Odd Fellows organization.  It has been deemed significant as "a rather late example of 'boomtown' construction dressed up in Italianate styling. It shows how the availability of materials like metal cornice, columns, etc. caused particular architectural styles or treatments to continue well past their heyday."

It was listed on the National Register of Historic Places in 1985.

References

Italianate architecture in Iowa
Cultural infrastructure completed in 1900
Buildings and structures in Linn County, Iowa
Odd Fellows buildings in Iowa
Clubhouses on the National Register of Historic Places in Iowa
National Register of Historic Places in Linn County, Iowa